Achille-Louis Martinet (21 January 1806, Paris - 9 December 1877, Paris) was a French engraver.

Biography 
He studied with François Forster and François Joseph Heim. In 1926, he was awarded second prize at the Prix de Rome, for his intaglios, and received the Grand Prize in 1830. Then, from 1831 to 1835, he lived at the Villa Medici while studying at the Académie de France à Rome which, at that time, was directed by Ingres. 

He was elected to the Académie des Beaux-Arts in 1857, where he took Seat #4 for engraving, succeeding  Auguste Gaspard Louis Desnoyers, who had held that position for forty-one years.

In 1846, he was named a Knight in the Legion of Honor, and was elevated to Officer in 1867.  The  in the 18th arrondissement of Paris is named after him.

He is best known for his work with a burin. His engravings include representations of paintings by old masters such as Raphaël, Rembrandt, and Murillo, as well as contemporaries, such as Ary Scheffer, Robert-Fleury, and Ingres. His youngest brother, Alphonse Martinet (1821-1861), was also an engraver.

References

Further reading
 P. L. Jacob and Paul Lacroix, Annuaire des artistes et des amateurs Vol.1, Académie de peinture et de sculpture, J. Renouard (Ed.), 1860 (Online)

External links 

 More works by Martinet @ the Harvard Art Museum

1806 births
1877 deaths
French engravers
Prix de Rome winners
Recipients of the Legion of Honour
Members of the Académie des beaux-arts
Engravers from Paris